The 2006 NCAA Division III women's basketball tournament was the 25th annual tournament hosted by the NCAA to determine the national champion of Division III women's collegiate basketball in the United States.

Hope defeated Southern Maine in the championship game, 69–56, to claim the Flying Dutchmen's second Division III national title and first since 1990.

The championship rounds were hosted by Springfield College in Springfield, Massachusetts.

Bracket

Final Four

All-tournament team
 Bria Ebels, Hope
 Julie Henderson, Hope
 Ashley Marble, Southern Maine
 Megan Myles, Southern Maine
 Taryn Mellody, Scranton

See also
 2006 NCAA Division I women's basketball tournament
 2006 NCAA Division II women's basketball tournament
 2006 NAIA Division I women's basketball tournament
 2006 NAIA Division II women's basketball tournament
 2006 NCAA Division III men's basketball tournament

References

 
NCAA Division III women's basketball tournament
2006 in sports in Massachusetts
Hope Flying Dutch women's basketball
Southern Maine Huskies